WIOX (91.3 FM) is a community radio station licensed to Roxbury, New York, and serving Delaware County and the Catskill Mountains region.

History
Originally licensed to the Town of Roxbury, WIOX received its initial construction permit from the Federal Communications Commission on May 7, 2008. The new station was assigned the WIOX call sign by the FCC on May 14, 2008. The station received its license to cover from the FCC on September 23, 2010. In 2014, the WSKG Public Telecommunications Council became the licensee of WIOX. The station's license was transferred to WIOX, Inc. effective May 8, 2018, for $1.

See also
 WSKG-FM
 WSQX-FM

References

External links
 

IOX
Radio stations established in 2010
2010 establishments in New York (state)
Community radio stations in the United States